Crematogaster acuta is a species of ant in tribe Crematogastrini. It was described by Johan Christian Fabricius in 1804.

References

acuta
Insects described in 1804